Percussion and Bass is an album recorded by drummer Jo Jones and bassist Milt Hinton in 1960 and released by the Everest label.

Reception

AllMusic reviewer Ken Dryden stated "this historical curiosity, originally recorded for Everest, featues (sic) just the two of them exploring the rhythmic possibilities within a dozen numbers. Jones' brushwork is matchless as usual, while Hinton's considerable technique is also apparent. ... While the playing time is brief at just 34 minutes, it's great to hear two masters at work".

Track listing
All compositions by Jo Jones except where noted
 "Tam" – 2:00
 "Me and You" (Milt Hinton) – 2:25
 "Coffee Dan" (Hinton) – 2:54
 "The Love Nest" (Louis Hirsch, Otto Harbach) – 4:34
 "H.O.T. (Helen of Troy)" – 2:30
 "Shoes on the Ruffs" – 3:40
 "The Walls Fall" (Jones, Hinton) – 2:35
 "Blue Skies" (Irving Berlin) – 2:35
 "Late in the Evenin'" (Hinton, Everett Barksdale) – 2:21
 "Ocho Puertas" – 2:55
 "Tin Top Alley Blues" (Jones, Hinton) – 3:01
 "Little Honey" – 2:34

Personnel 
Jo Jones – drums, percussion
Milt Hinton – bass

References 

1960 albums
Jo Jones albums
Milt Hinton albums
Everest Records albums